NSAA may refer to:

 National State Auditors Association
 Nebraska School Activities Association
 North Star Athletic Association
 Nonsteroidal antiandrogen
 Non-standard amino acids: non-proteinogenic amino acids used for an expanded genetic code 
 The New School for the Arts and Academics